Kurume is a town and commune in Cameroon located along the Kumba - Mamfe road in the Southwest Region.
Kurume is a place in Konye commune, Meme department, Southwest Region, Cameroon. It is located north of the city of Kumba. The inhabitants speak the Bafaw form of the Bafaw-Balong language.

References 

Populated places in Southwest Region (Cameroon)